Do You Want the Truth or Something Beautiful? is the debut studio album by English recording artist Paloma Faith. It was released on 28 September 2009 by Epic Records. Its first two singles from the album, "Stone Cold Sober" and "New York", both peaked within the top twenty in the United Kingdom. The album spawned three more singles: "Do You Want the Truth or Something Beautiful?", "Upside Down" and "Smoke & Mirrors".

The album received mixed reviews from critics. Since its release, the album has spent 106 weeks on the UK Albums Chart and peaked at number 9. It was announced on 1 March 2013 that the album had been certified 2× Platinum with sales exceeding 600,000 copies. To promote the album Faith embarked her first concert Do You Want the Truth or Something Beautiful Tour on 12 February 2010 which visited Europe.

Background
During her time at college, Faith worked in a pub where the manager asked her to front his band, which they later called Paloma and the Penetrators. During a performance with the band at a cabaret show, Faith was scouted by an A&R man from Epic Records, who invited Faith to sing for the manager of the label. Twenty minutes into the audition, Faith asked the manager to turn his phone off and when he refused, she walked out. Epic A&R Joanna Charrington told HitQuarters "When she played a showcase for us it was clear that she was a star but the material was a bit generic. She didn't have the hit songs". The label executives decided not to pursue it any further at that stage.

Charrington continued to regularly check Faith's MySpace page "to see if she had something that had a special direction or sound." After several months her attention was eventually piqued by "Broken Doll", which she thought was a well-crafted song with a "fantastic chorus and brilliant lyrics." Charrington told Epic managing director Nick Raphael "I think we should get this girl back in. She sounds like she is getting it now. We can help her get the songs." Faith revealed in an interview that the manager called her and offered her a contract saying he had seen many acts since and none had been as memorable as her.

Critical reception

Do You Want the Truth or Something Beautiful? received generally mixed reviews from music critics. In a BBC Music review Mike Diver stated, "Faith's voice is the first element of these sumptuous arrangements to strike, its idiosyncratic ticks and sharp inflections separating her from the pack in the same way as Duffy – but while the Welsh star's vocals can lack a sincere conveyance of the emotions behind a song, Faith's sentiments are never in doubt, even on the surprisingly underwhelming (in context) singles 'Stone Cold Sober' and 'New York'. The former sounds designed to soundtrack an advertisement – successfully, as it turns out – and the latter's lamenting loses some of its edge when one's unsure if the New York in question is a rival lover or, literally, the city that never sleeps. Whichever it is, it's stolen our protagonist's lover away".

Andy Gill of The Independent said: "In the case of this impressive debut album, that might refer to her fabricated Amy Winehouse persona, which is a touch too smoothly effected to ring entirely true. It's there right from the off with the Amy/Duffy retro-soul stylings of 'Stone Cold Sober'; while her claim in 'Broken Doll' that she's "damaged goods" seems that bit too eager to echo Amy's admission "I told you I was trouble". But Paloma deals in similarly grand, melodramatic emotions in songs such as 'Smoke And Mirrors', 'New York' and the title-track, wheeling out Spectorian tubular bells and keening string glissandi to evoke the depths of her emotional catastrophe". Robyn Burrows of Contact Music concluded "Musically diverse and well produced; it is a polished diamond. Faith's captivating vocals and huge range keep you hooked throughout and encourage you to press repeat as soon as the album ends." He only found fault in the shortness of the album. 

Maddy Costa of The Guardian gave an overwhelmingly negative review, contrasting Faith's image to her "conventional" music: while some elements "hint at the performer Faith purports to be ... her protestations of otherness ring hollow when her music is so specious and bland". NME described the album with the tagline "Burlesque pop with less weight than a feather fan." AllMusic, while generally favorable of the album, still finds that "Faith's tracks seem too glossy and processed, as if an executive has tried too hard to make many of these tracks way too commercial", believing that said refinement goes against the spirit that Faith is trying to convey: "The overall mood of the album feels a bit broken and battered, but comes off too polished to let that feeling drive home."

Commercial performance

Do You Want the Truth or Something Beautiful? peaked at number 9 in the UK. In just under 2 months of the album being released, it received a Gold certification with sales over 100,000, later being certified as Platinum. The album stayed in the UK top 100 albums chart for 62 weeks, in its 63rd week it fell out the top 100 albums to no. 110, however the week after charted back into the top 100. On 9 January 2011, the album made number 41, and has spent a total of 73 weeks on the chart. On 1 March 2013, the album was certified double-platinum, denoting sales of over 600,000 copies.

The album had moderate success elsewhere, it charted within the top 30 in Ireland, where it charted at 26. Do You Want the Truth or Something Beautiful? charted at number 3 in Scotland. In Switzerland the album charted again, within the top 40, where it charted at number 39. In the Netherlands the album also charted at number 50. In Finland, the album charted at number 46 and in Poland the album charted at number 39.

Singles
"Stone Cold Sober" was released on 15 June 2009 and entered the UK chart at number 17. The accompanying video was directed by the English music video director Sophie Muller. This song is featured in the Rimmel London commercial for the MAX lashes product, and in Castle promo on SBS 6.  "New York" was released on 13 September 2009. The song features a sweeping gospel chorus by the London-based Souls of Prophecy Gospel Choir. Digital Spy gave the song 3/5 stars and a less positive rating than "Stone Cold Sober". "New York" debuted on the UK Singles Chart at 21, the next week it fell to 31 and was expected to fall quickly out of the charts by most, but the next week it rose 16 places to 15, which became its peak position. It is Paloma Faith's most successful single to date, peaking within the top ten in two countries, within the top 20 in 4 countries and within the top 100 in 8 countries!  "Do You Want the Truth or Something Beautiful?", the title track to the album, was released on 21 December 2009. Digital Spy gave the song 4/5. The single began to receive increased radio airplay throughout December 2009, and throughout January 2010. As such, the single began to receive increasing amounts of digital downloads, and after lingering in the Top 100 on the UK iTunes Chart for a matter of weeks, the song finally entered the UK Singles Chart on 2 January 2010 at number 90. The song peaked at number 64.

"Upside Down" was released on 15 March 2010, as the album's third single. The accompanying video was directed by Chris Sweeney who directed the video for her previous single, "Do You Want the Truth or Something Beautiful?". Before the single was released, the British entertainment and media website Digital Spy said that "Upside Down backs up Faith's claim to have absorbed influences from the pre-rock 'n' roll era, mixing up a '50s dance hall vibe with her ever-present soul croon". Charles Decant of Ozap called the single "the more playful title on the album". On 14 March 2010, "Upside Down" debuted on the UK Singles Chart at number 89, on downloads alone. The following week, the single climbed to number 58, which was followed by a further climb of 3 on 28 March 2010 to its current peak at number 55. A new version of "New York" featuring rapper Ghostface Killah was released on 1 August. It peaked at number 44 on the UK Singles Chart and received mixed responses. "Smoke & Mirrors", was the 5th and final single from the album. During an interview on Something for the Weekend on 15 August 2010, Faith confirmed "Smoke & Mirrors" would be the final single from the album, and that she would be filming the video "very soon". At Hylands Park, as part of the 2010 V Festival, she announced that filming for the video has been completed. The video premiered on 11 September, on Faith's official Facebook page. It was released on 31 October 2010, added to Radio 1's B Playlis, and peaked at number 140 in the UK.

Tour

Paloma Faith went on her first major tour in 2010. The UK leg of the tour was confirmed on 4 November 2009, when Faith announced that she would visit the UK and Ireland starting on 17 March 2010. The album will feature songs from Paloma Faith's Platinum album, Do You Want the Truth or Something Beautiful?. In April 2010, Faith extended her tour for throughout October and November, where she will visit a number of different venues. She was supported by Eliza Doolittle, Bashy, Josh Weller, LA Shark and Alan Pownell.

Track listing

B-sides
The following tracks were not released on the album, but have been released as a single B-side.

 signifies a co-producer

Personnel
Adapted from AllMusic.

Paloma Faith – main vocals,  background vocals, handclapping
Carol Riley – background vocals
Dee Dee Wilde – background vocals
Donna Allen – background vocals
Patricia Scott – background vocals
Emily McEwan – background vocals
Joy Malcolm – background vocals
Brian Jones – background vocals
 Edith Langley – background vocals
 Marcus Johnson – background vocals
Subrina McCalla – background vocals
Venessa Yeboah – background vocals
Ian Pitter – background vocals
Jodi Marr – brass arrangement, producer, background vocals
Lawrence Johnson – background vocals vocal arrangement
 Rosie Langley – violin, background vocals, string quartet
Robin Bailey – reid background vocals
Seye Adelekan – guitar, background vocals
David Paul Campbell – brass arrangement
Sarah Tuke – violin
Sato Kotono – viola
Úna Palliser – viola
Laura Stanford – violin
Fiona Brice – violin
Jesse Murphy – violin
Luke Potashnick – guitar
Amy Langley – string – Quartet
Ruthie Phoenix – saxophone
Llinos Richards – cello
Harriet Wiltshire – cello
Matthew Waer – upright bass
Steve Robson – keyboards, string arrangements, instrumentation, producer, programming
Jeremy Stacey – percussion, drums
Andy Newmark – drums
Felix Bloxsom – drums
Ali Friend – bass
Jim Hunt – horn
Patrick Byrne – guitar, keyboards, percussion
Blair Mackichan – guitar, handclapping
George Noriega – keyboards, brass arrangement
Pete Davis – bass, drum programming
Ben Castle – clarinet, tenor saxophone
Greg Kurstin – guitar, keyboards
The London Session – orchestra strings
Nichol Thompson – horn
Samuel Dixon – piano, bass, celeste,  electric guitar, toy piano, vibraphone
Dominic Glover – trumpet, horn, horn arrangements
Ed Harcourt – guitar, wurlitzer, piano, percussion
Hadrian Garrard – trumpet
Leo Abrahams – guitar
Rob Wells – piano, keyboards, brass arrangement
Joe Walters – horn
Laura Anstee – cello
Per Ekdahl – string arrangements
Karl Brazil – drums
Trevor Mires – trombone
Ryan Granville Martin – drums
Daniel Pherson – string and keyboard engineer
Darren Heelis – assistant
Jamie Reddington – producer
Gandalf Roudette Muschamp – engineer
Jossip Serrano – engineer
Jon Bailey – engineer
Niall Acott – engineer
Andreas Unge – string engineer
Simon Hale – conductor, string arrangements
Oliver Kraus – strings, string arrangements, string engineer
Jay Reynolds – producer
George Noriega – keyboards, producer, brass arrangement, programming
Blair Mackichan – producer, engineer
Perry Mason – orchestra leader
Patrick Byrne – programming, producer, engineer
Carlos Alvarez – engineer
Richard Flack – engineer
Steve Fitzmaurice – arranger, mixing
James Stone – assistant
Steve Fitzmaurice – arranger, mixing
Greg Kurstin – programming, producer, engineer
Samuel Dixon – producer, engineer, programming
Ed Harcourt – producer
Rob Wells – producer, programming
Ian Barter – producer
Olga Fitzroy – assistant
Eamonn Hughes – hair stylist
Moritz Junge – stylist
Finlay MacKay – photography
Petra Storrs – set design

Charts and certifications

Weekly charts

Year-end charts

Certifications

Release history

References

2009 debut albums
Paloma Faith albums
Albums produced by Greg Kurstin
Albums produced by Samuel Dixon
Epic Records albums